Julie Claire Dibens (born 4 March 1975 in Salisbury, England) is a former professional triathlete. She represented Great Britain in the 2004 Summer Olympics and has won the 2009 Ironman 70.3 World Championship as well as the XTERRA Triathlon World Champion in 2007, 2008 and 2009. Dibens retired as a professional triathlete and is now a full time triathlon coach. She lives in Boulder, Colorado, USA.

Background 
Dibens started her sporting career in swimming, competing for Great Britain as a junior in 1991. She then received a swimming scholarship from Louisiana State University (LSU) where she obtained All American honors.

Whilst at LSU, she obtained two degrees:
 B.S. of kinesiology
 M.S. exercise physiology

After her college eligibility finished, in 1997, she began training for triathlon.

Notable triathlon achievements
 Ironman Coeur D'Alene Champion - 2011
 Rev3 Quassy Champion - 2011
 XTERRA Triathlon World Championship 2nd - 2010
 Ironman World Championship 3rd - 2010
 70.3 World Champion - 2009
 XTERRA Triathlon World Champion - 2007, 2008, 2009
 Abu Dhabi International Triathlon Champion - 2010, 2011
 UK Xterra Champion - 2007, 2008, 2009
 World Champion (amateur female) - 1998
 World Championships 8th - 2004
 Olympics 30th - 2004 Summer Olympics
 Great Britain Amateur of the Year - 1998
 USTS Series Champion - 1999
 European Championship Bronze Medalist - 2000
 British National Champion - 2007
 St. Croix 70.3 Champion - 2007
 UK 70.3 Champion - 2007
 Swiss 70.3 Champion - 2008
 London Triathlon Champion - 2008
 2008 Ironman 70.3 World Championships 4th
 Boulder 5430 Long Course Champion - 2009
 Olympic Qualifier 2000 Summer Olympics

Dibens qualified for both the 2000 and 2004 Olympics but was forced to withdraw from the 2000 Games because of a knee injury.

References

External links
 Julie Dibens Coaching website
 ITU profile

1975 births
Living people
LSU Lady Tigers swimmers
English female triathletes
Triathletes at the 2004 Summer Olympics
Olympic triathletes of Great Britain
Sportspeople from Salisbury
Duathletes
Triathletes at the 2006 Commonwealth Games
Commonwealth Games competitors for England
English emigrants to the United States
Triathlon coaches